Feliu Gasull (born 1959 in  Barcelona) is a Spanish flamenco guitarist and composer.

He studied guitar at the Geneva Conservatory of Music and composition at Indiana University. In 1988 he won the Carmichael Competition and collaborated with Pedro Javier González in late 1980s. He has been part of several ensembles, including the New Music Ensemble. In 2007 he released the album L'Ull. His style combines flamenco and classical music, especially chamber music.

References

External links
Official site
L'Ull review at Allmusic.com

1959 births
Living people
Musicians from Barcelona
Spanish flamenco guitarists
Spanish male guitarists
Spanish composers
Spanish male composers
Indiana University alumni
Flamenco guitarists